Rami Anis (born March 18, 1991) is a Syrian swimmer, who now resides in Belgium, and representing a small Refugee Olympic Team (ROT) under the Olympic flag, at the 2016 Summer Olympics in Rio de Janeiro. As war took hold of his home town Aleppo, Anis fled to Turkey then, by dinghy to Greece and on to Belgium.

His uncle Majad, who was a Syrian representative swimmer, inspired him to become a swimmer.

Biography
As bombings and kidnappings in Aleppo became more frequent in 2011, Anis had to leave the city. His family sent him to stay with his older brother in Istanbul, Turkey. In Istanbul he trained at Galatasaray Sports Club. In search of a chance to prove himself, Anis left Turkey aboard an inflatable dinghy and made his way across to the Greek island of Samos. Eventually he reached Belgium where he was granted asylum in December 2015. Today he trains at the Royal Ghent Swimming Club and is coached by Carine Verbauwen.

References

External links
 Article about Anis

Living people
Syrian male swimmers
Refugee Olympic Team at the 2016 Summer Olympics
People from Aleppo
Refugees of the Syrian civil war
Swimmers at the 2016 Summer Olympics
Syrian expatriates in Belgium
1991 births
Swimmers at the 2006 Asian Games
Swimmers at the 2010 Asian Games
Asian Games competitors for Syria
21st-century Syrian people